Yucca sterilis is a species in the family Asparagaceae, native to the Uintah Basin region in Duchesne and Uintah Counties, Utah. It is closely related to Y. harrimaniae Trel.

Yucca sterilis is an acaulescent (trunkless) species spreading by underground rhizomes. The inflorescence is up to 40 cm tall, with flowers white or sometimes tinged with violet along the edges of the tepals.

References

sterilis
Plants described in 2008
Flora of Utah
Flora without expected TNC conservation status